Gerald W. "Gerry" Hyland was a member of the Fairfax County, Virginia Board of Supervisors. A Democrat, he has represented the Mount Vernon District (which includes Mount Vernon, Lorton, and Belle Haven) from 1988 to 2015. He retired as a colonel in the United States Air Force after 30 years of service, six of which on active duty, and four overseas.

Hyland was first elected to the Fairfax County Board of Supervisors in 1987, defeating incumbent Republican supervisor T. Farrell Egge by 27 votes.

In February 2015, the 78-year-old Hyland announced he would not seek reelection to the Board of Supervisors, and would retire at the end of the year.

References

External links
District info
Gerald Hyland Supervisor bio

Year of birth missing (living people)
Living people
Virginia Democrats
People from Fairfax County, Virginia
George Washington University alumni
College of the Holy Cross alumni
United States Air Force colonels
Georgetown University Law Center alumni
Members of the Fairfax County Board of Supervisors